Mayamohini is a 2012 Indian Malayalam-language action comedy film directed by Jose Thomas and written by Udayakrishna and Siby K. Thomas, starring Dileep in the title role with Biju Menon, Mohan Sharma, Baburaj, Mythili and Spadikam George in supporting roles. The film was the highest grossing Malayalam film of the year. The movie was remade in Kannada as Jai Lalitha.

Plot

A plane accident occurs in which a small child narrowly escapes, while his parents are killed. He is then looked after by his maternal uncle Appukuttan Nair, and all the family's wealth will be inherited by him. As per their astrologer, in the future he should marry a young woman whose star is Chothi Nakshatra, only then will he prosper in life. The boy grows up to be a young man named Balakrishnan, who is unsuccessful in anything he does.

He falls in love with Maya, the daughter of a wealthy businessman named Raj Kumar Patella, who is settled in Mumbai. When Patella learns about their relationship, he objects; Maya elopes with Balakrishnan. In the meantime Balakrishnan's friend Lakshminarayanan aka Lakshmi, tries to convince Appukuttan about the marriage and the uncle agrees to visit the couple. But then, on the second day of the marriage Maya leaves him and returns to Mumbai.

Balakrishnan didn't want Appukuttan to know that his wife left him, so he hires a woman Mayamohini to act as his wife, but it is revealed that Mayamohini is a man named Mohanakrishnan, whom the cops had been searching for. He had been put into a trap by Patella's manager Sanjay. Mohan reveals his true identity to Balakrishnan and he agrees to help him in his quest. They travel to Mumbai and there they meet Maya, who is working as a club dancer known by the name Katreena.

She agrees to help them and tells all truth about Pattela, that he is actually a fraudster and she was cheated by him years ago when being tricked to work in his company. In the flashback it turns out that Mohan's father, Sankaran Potti, a temple priest, was killed by Pattela and Sanjay to get hold of their property. Pattela is opening a new business (which is a fraud company) in town and on the inauguration day has arranged some dance as well.

Mohan gets dressed up as Mayamohini again. Pattela invites 'her' to his room and tries to have sex with 'her'. In the meantime, the cops arrive to arrest Mohan. 'Mayamohini' reveals her true as Mohan to Pattela and fights with him, Sanjay and their henchmen with Balakrishnan's help. When one of Pattela's henchman tries to kill Balakrishnan, Sanjay gets accidentally killed. Mohan kills Pattela and avenges his father's death. Later, Mohan is released of his charges. Later, Lakshmi's family comes for an alliance with Mayamohini, not knowing the truth. His sister was also with him and her star is revealed to be Chothi much to the delight of Balakrishnan.

Cast

 Dileep as Mayamohini/Mohanakrishnan 
 Biju Menon as Balakrishnan
 Baburaj as Advocate Lakshmi Narayanan
 Mohan Sharma as Raj Kumar Pattala
 Vijayaraghavan as Appukuttan Nair
 Mythili as Sangeetha Raghavan
 Lakshmi Rai as Maya aka Kathreena
 Spadikam George as SP "Tiger" Raghavan IPS
 Unnikrishnan Namboothiri as Bhaskaran Nair
 Balachandran Chullikkad as Shankaradi Melpathoor
 Madhu Warrier as ASP Anwar IPS
 Joju George as CI Johny
 Kazan Khan as Sanjay Mishra
 Kochu Preman as "Make up Man" Pappan Parapokkara
 Aju Varghese as Keezh Shanthi Vishnu
 Kalabhavan Shajon as   Shishubalan
 Sadiq as Koshi
 Nedumudi Venu as Sankaran Potti
 Ponnamma Babu as Doctor
 Bindu Ramakrishnan as Lakshmi Narayanan's Mother
 Ambika Mohan as Saraswathi Antharjanam 
 Radhika as Swathi
 V.K Baiju as Police Officer
 Naveen Arakkal as Police Officer
 Abu Salim as Theepori Paili
 Santhosh Nair as Sub Registar
 Riyaz Khan (Special appearance in "Mayamohini" song)
 Nishanth Sagar (Special appearance in "Mayamohini" song)
 Mafia Sasi (Special appearance in "Mayamohini" song)
 Sajitha Betti

Music
There are four tracks in the movie, Berny–Ignatius was music director.

Track listing

Reception

Critical response
Metro Matinee rated the film as Entertaining and said "Mayamohini certainly follows the same old formula, but even then it is a fairly enjoyable ride."  Sify rated the film as a Comedy Caper and said "With a briskly paced first half and a more serious second half, Mayamohini still turn out to be a nice option, for the summer holidays."

Box office
The film was commercial success. The film grossed ₹16.5 crore from 25 days in Kerala box office. In 50 days it grossed 18 crore from Kerala box office. The film collected 15,631 from UK box office. The film grossed a total of ₹22 crore from the box office.

References

External links 
 

2012 films
2010s Malayalam-language films
Films scored by Berny–Ignatius
2012 comedy films
Indian comedy films
Cross-dressing in Indian films
Malayalam films remade in other languages
Films directed by Jose Thomas